Sage Marie Steele (born November 28, 1972) is an American television anchor who is the co-host of the 12pm (ET) SportsCenter on ESPN.  She also hosts SportsCenter on the Road from various sporting events such as the Super Bowl and The Masters. Steele formerly hosted NBA Countdown on ESPN and ABC for four seasons, ending in 2017. For five years prior to the NBA assignment, Steele was a full-time host of SportsCenter, ESPN's flagship show, and had previously contributed to ESPN First Take, Mike & Mike in the Morning, and SportsNation. Steele hosted SportsCenters daytime coverage of the NBA Finals in 2012 and 2013, and  covered every NBA Finals from 2012 to 2020.

Early life
Steele is the daughter of Gary & Mona (O'Neil) Steele. Her dad is American and her mom is Irish-Italian. Gary is Black and became the first Black varsity football player at West Point during the mid-1960s. He was inducted into the Army Sports Hall of Fame in 2013 for his standout career on the Black Knights football and track & field teams. 
 
Sage Steele was born in 1972 into an American Army family living in the Panama Canal Zone Steele has two brothers, Courtney and Chad (senior vice president of media relations for the NFL's Baltimore Ravens). 

The U.S. Army stationed Steele's family in several different states and countries, including Greece and Belgium, before moving back stateside to Colorado Springs, Colorado, in 1984 for her seventh grade year. After attending Thomas B. Doherty High School in Colorado Springs for two years, she moved to Carmel, Indiana, and attended Carmel High School as a senior, graduating in 1990.

She graduated from Indiana University Bloomington in 1995 with a Bachelor of Science degree in sports communication.  Exactly 20 years later, she was the commencement speaker at the 2015 Indiana University undergraduate commencement, which she considers the greatest honor of her career.

Broadcasting career
Steele's first television sports reporting job was at WSBT-TV, the CBS affiliate in South Bend, Indiana, as a news producer and reporter from 1995 to 1997.

Steele then worked at CBS affiliate WISH-TV in Indianapolis, Indiana, from 1997 to 1998 as the weekend morning sports anchor and weekday reporter. Her reporting duties included the Indianapolis Colts, Indiana Pacers, Indianapolis 500 and Brickyard 400 auto races, and local college and high school sports.

Steele worked at ABC affiliate WFTS in Tampa, Florida, from 1998 to 2001, where she was a sports reporter with former WFTS sports director and former SportsCenter host Jay Crawford and current "NFL RedZone" host Scott Hanson.  She also worked at Fox Sports Florida as a reporter, continuing to cover teams throughout Central Florida such as the Tampa Bay Buccaneers, Orlando Magic, Tampa Bay Lightning and University of South Florida Bulls.

She then worked at Comcast SportsNet Mid-Atlantic in Bethesda, Maryland, where she was an anchor and reporter for the network's nightly local sports news program, SportsNite, covering all sports in the Washington, DC/Baltimore region.  Steele was one of Comcast SportsNet's original personalities, joining that network when it launched in 2001. During her six years at CSN Mid-Atlantic (2001–2007), she was a main anchor and also the beat reporter for the Baltimore Ravens.

Steele then joined ESPN and debuted on March 16, 2007, on the 6:00 p.m. ET edition of SportsCenter. In an interview with Awful Announcing, she mentioned that she was actually offered a job with the network in 2004, but turned it down while pregnant with her second child.

On July 28, 2013, she drove the pace car for the NASCAR Sprint Cup Series Brickyard 400.  During the pace laps at the beginning of the race, she was bumped in jest by 6-time Sprint Cup champion Jimmie Johnson.

Beginning in the 2013–14 NBA season, Steele became the host of NBA Countdown on ESPN and ABC through 2017.

Steele co-hosted the Miss America 2017 & 2018 pageant on ABC with Chris Harrison. She hosted the Scripps National Spelling Bee from 2010 to 2013. In 2014 she was a guest host several times on The View.

She became the noon (ET) SportsCenter co-anchor with Matt Barrie in February 2021. She had anchored the 6 p.m. ET edition of the show for several years before moving to noon and prior to that she had anchored SportsCenter:AM.

On October 5, 2021, she was suspended with pay by ESPN for remarks she made on Jay Cutler's September 29 podcast about COVID-19 vaccine mandates, women who dress in a way she feels is provocative, and Barack Obama calling himself Black even though he, like Steele, has a white mother. In conjunction with her suspension, Steele issued an apology: "I know my recent comments created controversy for the company, and I apologize. We are in the midst of an extremely challenging time that impacts all of us, and it's more critical than ever that we communicate constructively and thoughtfully."

Personal life
Steele married Jonathan Bailey and they have three children. In March 2021, Steele put her home in Avon, Connecticut on the market for $1.6 million, after doing extensive renovations.

She is on the board of the Pat Tillman Foundation. She was named to the board of the V Foundation for cancer research in 2019.

References

External links 
 
 

Living people
1972 births
American television sports announcers
Carmel High School (Indiana) alumni
Indiana University Bloomington alumni
Television anchors from Indianapolis
Women sports announcers
African-American sports journalists
American women sportswriters
ESPN people
Disney people
American sports journalists
African-American Christians
African-American television personalities
African-American women journalists
People from Colorado Springs, Colorado
People from Carmel, Indiana
American people of Irish descent
American people of Italian descent
Zonians
American women television journalists
American expatriates in Greece
American expatriates in Belgium
20th-century American journalists
21st-century American journalists
American Christians
21st-century American women
Panamanian people of American descent
Panamanian people of Italian descent